Sicyon (gen.: Σικυῶνος) or Sikyon was an ancient Greek city state situated in the northern Peloponnesus between Corinth and Achaea on the territory of the present-day regional unit of Corinthia. An ancient monarchy at the times of the Trojan War, the city was ruled by a number of tyrants during the Archaic and Classical period and became a democracy in the 3rd century BC. Sicyon was celebrated for its contributions to ancient Greek art, producing many famous painters and sculptors. In Hellenistic times it was also the home of Aratus of Sicyon, the leader of the Achaean League.

History

Sicyon was built on a low triangular plateau about 3 kilometres (two miles) from the Corinthian Gulf. Between the city and its port lay a fertile plain with olive groves and orchards.

In Mycenean times Sicyon had been ruled by a line of twenty-six mythical kings and then seven priests of Apollo. The king-list given by Pausanias comprises twenty-four kings, beginning with the autochthonous Aegialeus. The penultimate king of the list, Agamemnon, compels the submission of Sicyon to Mycenae; after him comes the Dorian usurper Phalces. Pausanias shares his source with Castor of Rhodes, who used the king-list in compiling tables of history; the common source was convincingly identified by Felix Jacoby as a lost Sicyonica by the late 4th-century poet Menaechmus of Sicyon.

After the Dorian invasion the city remained subject to Argos, whence its Dorian conquerors had come. The community was now divided into the ordinary three Dorian tribes and an equally privileged tribe of Ionians, besides which a class of serfs (or) lived on and worked the land.

For some centuries the suzerainty of Argos remained, but after 676 BC Sicyon regained its independence under a line of tyrants called the Orthagorides after the name of the first ruler Orthagoras. The most important however was the founder's grandson Cleisthenes, the grandfather of the Athenian legislator Cleisthenes, who ruled from 600 to 560 BC. Besides reforming the city's constitution to the advantage of the Ionians and replacing Dorian cults with the worship of Dionysus, Cleisthenes gained a reputation as the chief instigator and general of the First Sacred War (590 BC) in the interests of the Delphians.

His successor Aeschines was expelled by the Spartans in 556 BC and Sicyon became an ally of the Lacedaemonians for more than a century. During this time, the Sicyonians developed the various industries for which they were known in antiquity. As the abode of the sculptors Dipoenus and Scyllis it gained pre-eminence in woodcarving and bronze work such as is still to be seen in the archaic metal facings found at Olympia. Its pottery, which resembled Corinthian ware, was exported with the latter as far as Etruria. In Sicyon also the art of painting was supposed to have been invented. After the fall of the tyrants their institutions survived until the end of the 6th century BC, when Dorian supremacy was re-established, perhaps by the agency of Sparta  under the ephor Chilon, and the city was enrolled in the Peloponnesian League. Henceforth, its policy was usually determined either by Sparta or Corinth.

During the Persian Wars, the Sicyonians participated with fifteen triremes in the Battle of Salamis and with 3,000 hoplites in the Battle of Plataea. On the Delphic Serpent Column celebrating the victory Sicyon was named in fifth place after Sparta, Athens, Corinth and Tegea. In September 479 BC a Sicyonian contingent fought bravely in the Battle of Mycale, where they lost more men than any other city.

Later in the 5th century BC, Sicyon, like Corinth, suffered from the commercial rivalry of Athens in the western seas, and was repeatedly harassed by squadrons of Athenian ships. The Sicyonians fought two battles against the Athenians, first against their admiral Tolmides in 455 BC and then in a land battle against Pericles with 1000 hoplites in 453 BC.

In the Peloponnesian War Sicyon followed the lead of Sparta and Corinth. When these two powers quarrelled during the peace of Nicias, it remained loyal to the Spartans. At the reprise of the war, during the Athenian expedition in Sicily, the Sicyonians contributed 200 pressed hoplites under their commander Sargeus to the force that relieved Syracuse. At the beginning of the 4th century, in the Corinthian war, Sicyon sided again with Sparta and became its base of operations against the allied troops round Corinth.

In 369 BC Sicyon was captured and garrisoned by the Thebans in their successful attack on the Peloponnesian League. From 368 to 366 BC Sicyon was ruled by Euphron who first favoured democracy, but then made himself tyrant. Euphron was killed in Thebes by a group of Sicyonian aristocrats, but his compatriots buried him in his home town and continued to honour him like the second founder of the city.

During the 4th century BC, the city reached its zenith as a centre of art: its school of painting gained fame under Eupompus and attracted the great masters Pamphilus and Apelles as students, while Lysippus and his pupils raised the Sicyonian sculpture to a level hardly surpassed anywhere else in Greece. The tyrant Aristratus, a friend of the Macedonian royal family, had himself portrayed by the painter Melanthius aside the goddess of victory Nike on a chariot. In this period Sicyon was the undisputed center of Greek painting with its school attracting famous artists from all over Greece, including the celebrated Apelles and Pausias.

In 323 BC Euphron the Younger, a grandson of the tyrant Euphron, reintroduced a democracy, but was soon conquered by the Macedonians during the Lamian War. When the Macedonian commander Alexander was murdered in Sicyon in 314 BC, his wife Cratesipolis took control of the city and ruled it for six years, until she was induced by king Ptolemy I to hand it over to the Egyptians. Between 308 and 303 BC Sicyon was ruled by two Ptolemaic commanders, first Cleonides and then Philip.

In 303 BC Sicyon was conquered by Demetrius Poliorcetes who razed the ancient city in the plain and built a new wall on the ruins of the old Acropolis on the high triangular plateau which resulted sufficient for the reduced populace. The new agora was adorned by a "Painted Stoa" attributed to the king's mistress Lamia, a flute player. For a short time the town was now called "Demetrias", but eventually the old name prevailed.

Demetrius left a garrison in the castle to control the city, and the commander Cleon established another tyrannical regime. After some twenty years he was killed by two rivals, Euthydemus and Timocleidas, who became the new joint tyrants of Sicyon. Their rule ended, probably around the start of the Chremonidean War in 267 BC, when they were expelled by the people who elected their leader Cleinias to govern the city on a democratic ground. Two magistrates of these years were the hieromnemoi Sosicles and Euthydamos, known from an inscription at Delphi. The democratic government's most important achievement was the construction of the gymnasium which is attributed to Cleinias. During the same time Xenokrates of Sicyon published his history of art which contributed to spread the fame of Sicyion as an undisputed capital of ancient art.

Even this time democracy did not last more than a few years, and in 264 BC Cleinias was slain by his cognate Abantidas, who established his tyranny for twelve years. In 252 BC Abantidas was murdered by two rhetoricians, Aristotle the Dialectician and Deinias of Argos, and his father Paseas took over, only to be murdered after a short rule by another rival named Nicocles.

In 251, Aratus of Sicyon, the 20-year-old son of Cleinias, conquered the city with a night assault and expelled the last tyrant. Aratus re-established democracy, called back the exiles and brought his city into the Achaean League. This move ended the internal strife and Aratus remained the leading figure of Achaean politics until his death in 213 BC, during a period of great achievements. The prosperity and peaceful condition of Sicyon was only interrupted by an Aetolian raid in 241 BC and an unsuccessful siege at the hands of king Cleomenes III of Sparta in early 224 BC.

As a member of the Achaean federation Sicyon remained a stable democracy until the dissolution of the League by the Romans in 146 BC. In this period Sicyon was damaged by two disastrous earthquakes in 153 BC and 141 BC.

The destruction of Corinth (146 BC) brought Sicyon an acquisition of territory and the presidency over the Isthmian games; yet in Cicero's time it had fallen deep into debt. Under the Roman empire it was quite obscured by the restored cities of Corinth and Patrae; in Pausanias' age (150 AD) it was almost desolate. In Byzantine times it became a bishop's seat, and to judge by its later name Hellas it served as a refuge for the Greeks from the Slavonic invasions of the 8th century.

In the 4th century BC the people of Sicyon were the subject of a popular comedy by Menander titled Sikyonioi.

William Shakespeare, in his 1606 play Antony and Cleopatra (Act I, Scene 2), notes that Marc Antony's wife, Fulvia died in Sicyon.  Historically, she died there in 40 BC while in rebellion against Octavius Caesar.

Friedrich Hölderlin's novel Hyperion from 1797 starts at the "paradisiac plain of Sicyon".

Monuments 
 Temple of Apollo or Artemis
 Theatre of Sikyon
 Palaestra - Gymnasium
 Stadium of Sikyon
 Bouleuterion of Sikyon

A village named until 1920 Vasiliko (described by the 1911 Encyclopædia Britannica as "insignificant") now occupies the site.

Mythological Rulers
Rulers according to Eusebius's chronicle and other greek sources are:
1st:Aegialeus
2nd:Europs
3rd:Telchis
4th:Apis of Sicyon
5th: Thelxion of Sicyon
6th:Aegyrus
7th:Thurimachus
8th:Leucippus
9th:Messapus or Peratus
10th:Plemnaeus
11th:Orthopolis
12th:Marathonius or Coronus
13th:Marathus
14th:
15th:Coronus or Echyreus
16th:Corax
17th :Epopeus of Sicyon
18th:Lamedon
19th:Sicyon
20th:Polybus of Sicyon
21st:Adrastus

Before Agammemnon:Polypheides

Notable people 
Ancient
Aegialeus (21st century BC) legendary founder
Tellis (8th century BC), runner (Olympic victor 708 BC)
Butades (7th century BC) sculptor
Canachus (6th century BC) sculptor
Aristocles (5th century BC) sculptor
Praxilla (5th century BC) poetess
Ariphron (5th century BC) poet
Alypus (5th to 4th century BC) sculptor
Alexis (5th or 4th century BC) sculptor
Eupompus (4th century BC) painter
Pamphilus (4th century BC) painter
Melanthius (4th century BC) painter
Pausias (4th century BC) painter
Eutychides (4th century BC) sculptor
Lysippos (4th century BC) sculptor
Lysistratus (4th century BC) sculptor
Sostrates (4th century BC) pankratiast (thrice Olympic champion)
Xenokrates (3rd century BC) sculptor and art historian
Machon (3rd century BC) playwright
Timanthes (3rd century BC) painter
Nealkes (3rd century BC) painter
Anaxandra (3rd century BC) female painter
Pythocles (3rd century BC), runner (Olympic victor 236 BC)
Aratus of Sicyon (271–213 BC) strategos of the Achaean League
Baccheidas, a dancer and teacher of music
Daetondas of Sicyon, sculptor

Modern
Sotirios Krokidas, jurist and PM

Mythology: Identification with Mecone
Sicyon has been traditionally identified with the mythical Mecone or Mekone, site of the trick at Mecone carried out by Prometheus. Mecone is also described by Callimachus as "the seat of the gods", and as the place where the brother deities Zeus, Poseidon and Hades cast lots for what part of the world each would rule.

See also
List of ancient Greek cities

References

External links

"Sicyon: The most ancient Greek city-state (via archive.org)", Ellen Papakyriakou/Anagnostou. Contains a great deal of information on ancient and present-day Sicyon.
"The Greco-Roman Theatre at Sicyon", The Ancient Theatre Archive. Theatre specifications and tour of the ancient theatre.

 
Greek city-states
Former populated places in Greece
Cities in ancient Peloponnese
Populated places in ancient Peloponnese
Ancient Greek cities
Locations in the Iliad